In public transport, Route 13 may refer to:

Route 13 (MTA Maryland), a bus route in Baltimore, Maryland
NWFB Route 13, a bus route in Hong Kong
London Buses route 13
SEPTA Route 13, a streetcar line in Philadelphia, Pennsylvania and its suburbs
Tokyo Metro Fukutoshin Line, formerly the no. 13 Fukutoshin Line
Shanghai Metro Line 13, a subway line in Shanghai

13